The Limmo Peninsula is an area of Canning Town in the London Borough of Newham in London's East End. It lies on the east bank of Bow Creek at the mouth of the River Lea near Leamouth.

Etymology
Created in the 1990s, the nearby Bow Creek Ecology Park was formerly known as the Limmo Peninsula Ecological Park.

History
It was the primary work site for the eastbound tunnel boring machines for Crossrail. Archaeologists working on the Crossrail site in 2012 uncovered remains of the Thames Ironworks and Shipbuilding Company.

In 2018, Sadiq Khan announced that, following the completion of Crossrail works in 2018, the 12-acre site would be developed for housing – with over 1,500 new homes. The site is currently owned by Transport for London, with income from the project reinvested into the transport system.

Geography
It is located to the west of Canning Town. The River Lea forms an 'S' shape bend with the Leamouth Peninsula surrounded by Newham on three side and connected to Tower Hamlets to the south.

See also
 List of tunnels in the United Kingdom

References

External links
 Engineering Geology and Tunnelling in the Limmo Peninsula, East London, Quarterly Journal of Engineering Geology and Hydrogeology, Geological Society, 20 August 2017

Districts of the London Borough of Newham
Areas of London
Canning Town